Orsolobus is a genus of South American araneomorph spiders in the family Orsolobidae, and was first described by Eugène Louis Simon in 1893.

Species
 it contains nine species, found only in Argentina and Chile:
Orsolobus chelifer Tullgren, 1902 – Chile
Orsolobus chilensis Forster & Platnick, 1985 – Chile
Orsolobus mapocho Forster & Platnick, 1985 – Chile
Orsolobus montt Forster & Platnick, 1985 – Chile
Orsolobus plenus Forster & Platnick, 1985 – Chile
Orsolobus pucara Forster & Platnick, 1985 – Chile, Argentina
Orsolobus pucatrihue Forster & Platnick, 1985 – Chile
Orsolobus schlingeri Forster & Platnick, 1985 – Chile
Orsolobus singularis (Nicolet, 1849) (type) – Chile

See also
 List of Orsolobidae species

References

Araneomorphae genera
Orsolobidae
Spiders of South America